Chong Ted Tsiung (Pha̍k-fa-sṳ: Chông Tet-tshiùng) was the third mayor of Kuching City South Council. He succeeded Chan Seng Khai who was the second mayor of Kuching City South Council on 31 July 2005. He was the first non-politician to be appointed as a mayor of Kuching City South Council, having previously been employed by the state as Controller of Environment Quality.

Early life
Born in a family of 9 in Kuching on 18 June 1956, he received his 6-year primary education at 10th Mile Chinese Primary School and his secondary education at Dragon Government Secondary' School, 24th Mile Kuching-Serian Road. In 1982, he graduated with a bachelor's degree (Honours) in Public Administration from De Montfort University, Leicester, England, Later, in 1995 he obtained his Master of Science in Environmental Policy and Management from Hull University, UK.

References

External links
 Press release by MBKS on late Mayor Chong Ted Tsiung
 Kuching South City Council website

Malaysian politicians
Malaysian people of Chinese descent
1956 births
Malaysian people of Hakka descent
2007 deaths
People from Kuching